Yevgeniy Meleshenko (born 19 January 1981) is a Kazakhstani hurdler.

Career 
He finished fifth at the 2002 World Junior Championships, won the silver medal at the 2001 Summer Universiade and finished ninth at the 2006 World Cup. He also finished seventh in the 4x400 metres relay at the 2005 Summer Universiade.

On the regional level he won the bronze medal at the 2002 Asian Championships, the silver medals at the 2003 and 2005 Asian Championships and the gold medal at the 2007 Asian Championships. He finished fourth at the 2006 Asian Games. He also won a gold in the Athletics at the 2003 Afro-Asian Games.

He also competed at the World Championships in 2003, 2005 and 2007 as well as the Olympic Games in 2004 and the 2008 without reaching the final.

His personal best time is 48.46 seconds, achieved at the 2001 Summer Universiade in Beijing.

Competition record

References

External links 

1981 births
Living people
Sportspeople from Kokshetau
Kazakhstani male hurdlers
Athletes (track and field) at the 2004 Summer Olympics
Athletes (track and field) at the 2008 Summer Olympics
Olympic athletes of Kazakhstan
Athletes (track and field) at the 2002 Asian Games
Athletes (track and field) at the 2006 Asian Games
Athletes (track and field) at the 2010 Asian Games
Universiade medalists in athletics (track and field)
Universiade silver medalists for Kazakhstan
Asian Games competitors for Kazakhstan
Medalists at the 2001 Summer Universiade